North Thompson Oxbows Manteau Provincial Park is a provincial park in Thompson-Nicola Regional District in the Interior region of British Columbia, Canada. It protects "…floodplain wetlands, numerous oxbow lakes, sandbars, back channels, levees, along the glacier-fed North Thompson River." There are no camping or day-use facilities.

The mouth of Canvas Creek is located in the park.

References

External links

Provincial parks of British Columbia
Thompson Country
1996 establishments in British Columbia
Protected areas established in 1996